The Fiat 4700 was an Italian turbo-generator developed by Fiat Aviazione under contract to the Italian Defence Ministry and used to power the experimental Fiat 7002 tip jet helicopter.

Design and development
The Fiat 4700 was developed to provide power in cold-jet driven helicopters. The 4700 was a turbo-driven air compressor driven by the primary engine, a turbojet engine based on the Fiat 4002. The compressor and primary engine are mechanically independent. The engine is mounted vertically to reduce the length of the compressed-air ducts to the rotor. The engine was used on the Fiat 7002 helicopter which first flew on 26 January 1961 where the Fiat 4700 was used to power the cold tip-jets on the two-blade rotor.

Applications
 Fiat 7002

Specification

See also

References

Notes

4700
Aircraft gas generator engines